Prison Terminal: The Last Days of Private Jack Hall is a 2013 documentary film by  Edgar Barens.

Synopsis
This film tells the story of Jack Hall, a terminally ill octogenarian lifer at Iowa State Penitentiary. The film looks at the last six months of Jack's life and the creation of a hospice run by other inmates serving life sentences. The film is a no-nonsense look at the aging population in America's prisons and how one group helps prisoners die with dignity.

Awards

References

External links
 
 

2013 films
2013 short documentary films
Documentary films about death
Documentary films about incarceration in the United States
Documentary films about old age
Films scored by Max Richter
Films shot in Iowa
Penal system in Iowa
2010s American films